is a twelve episode Japanese anime series featuring adaptations inspired by six short stories from Japanese literature. The six stories are adapted from classic Japanese tales. Happinet, Hakuhodo DY Media Partners, McRAY, MTI, Threelight Holdings, Movic, and Visionare were involved in the production of the series. Character designs were provided by manga artists Takeshi Obata (#1–4, 7–8), Tite Kubo (#5–6, 11, 12) and Takeshi Konomi (#9–10).

Stories adapted
 No Longer Human, by Osamu Dazai (episode 1–4): The path of a man with intense feelings of alienation towards society and the feeling of "humanity".
 Sakura no Mori no Mankai no Shita, by Ango Sakaguchi (episode 5–6): A forest bandit finds a beautiful maiden in the forest and takes her to be his wife, but she is more than she seems to be.
 Kokoro, by Natsume Sōseki (episode 7–8): A young man lives in Tokyo as a renter with a widow and her daughter. He invites his childhood friend to come live with him, hoping to help him out of his depression. When his friend falls in love with the widow's daughter, it drives a rift between them. The story is narrated twice from different points of view.
 Run, Melos!, by Osamu Dazai (episode 9–10): A playwright writes a play based on the story "Run, Melos", and deals with his own feelings of betrayal towards his childhood friend.
 The Spider's Thread, by Ryūnosuke Akutagawa (episode 11): Kandata, a cruel and evil bandit, is executed and lands in hell. The one good thing he had done in his life was to not kill a spider he met in the city. The spider drops him a thread to climb up into heaven. His elation is short-lived, however, as he realizes that others have started climbing the thread behind him.
 Hell Screen, by Ryūnosuke Akutagawa (episode 12): Yoshihide, the greatest painter in the country, is commissioned to draw his greatest work, an image of the king's country inside his mausoleum. In the despotic king's realm, Yoshihide can see nothing but the suffering of the commoners. He decides to make his last work a tribute to the country as it really is.

Reception
Emmanuel Bahu-Leyser from the French Animeland found it exceptional to have such realistic, deep and mature stories to be adapted into anime. He went further by describing the series as a gold nugget both culturally and technically. On the negative side, he noted that the adaptation quality is uneven between the teams.

References

External links
Official anime website 

Madhouse (company)
Anime series
Takeshi Obata